Douglas, Dougie or Doug Wilson may refer to:

Academics
 Douglas Wilson (theologian) (born 1953), Christian pastor and author
 Douglas L. Wilson (born 1935), professor and co-director of Lincoln Studies Center at Knox College

Television
 Douglas Wilson (interior designer), designer on the television program Trading Spaces
 Doug Wilson (Weeds character), fictional character in the television series Weeds, portrayed by actor Kevin Nealon

Other
 Douglas Wilson (RAAF officer) (1898–1950), Royal Australian Air Force officer
 Douglas Wilson (bishop) (1903–1980), Anglican bishop in the Caribbean
 Doug Wilson (athlete) (1920–2010), British athlete
 Doug Wilson (rugby union) (1931–2019), New Zealand rugby union player
 Douglas Wilson (activist) (1950–1992), gay activist from Canada
 Doug Wilson (ice hockey) (born 1957), retired professional hockey player, current GM of the San Jose Sharks
 Doug Wilson (racing driver), retired NASCAR Cup Series driver
 Dougie Wilson (born 1994), Northern Irish footballer
 Douglas Wilson (basketball) (born 1999), American college basketball player